Sami Said may refer to:

 Sami D. Said, a U.S. Air Force lieutenant general
 Sami Said (writer), an Eritrean-born Swedish novelist